Cephalosphaera is a monotypic genus of flowering plants in the nutmeg family, Myristicaceae. The only species is Cephalosphaera usambarensis, a tree native to the moist evergreen forests of Kenya and Tanzania.

The genus' nearest relative is the genus Brochoneura, native to Madagascar.

Range and habitat
Cephalosphaera is restricted to small areas in the Usambara, Nguru, Uluguru, and Udzungwa mountains of Tanzania and the Shimba Hills of Kenya. 

It is endemic to transitional rain forest, a mid-elevation plant community found on seaward-facing mountain slopes above 800 meters elevation, and occasionally at lower elevations in stream valleys.

References

Myristicaceae
Flora of Kenya
Flora of Tanzania
Vulnerable plants
Taxonomy articles created by Polbot
Northern Zanzibar–Inhambane coastal forest mosaic